Swindon was a parliamentary constituency in the town of Swindon in Wiltshire, England.

It returned one Member of Parliament (MP)  to the House of Commons of the Parliament of the United Kingdom from the 1918 general election until it was abolished for the 1997 general election.

It was then replaced by the two new constituencies of North Swindon and South Swindon.

History

Boundaries 
1918–1950: The Borough of Swindon, and the part of the Rural District of Highworth which was not included in the Devizes constituency.

1950–1983: The Borough of Swindon.

1983–1997: The Borough of Thamesdown wards of Central, Dorcan, Eastcott, Gorse Hill, Lawns, Moredon, Park, Toothill, Walcot, Western, and Whitworth.

Members of Parliament

Elections

Election in the 1910s

Elections in the 1920s

Elections in the 1930s

Elections in the 1940s

Elections in the 1950s

Elections in the 1960s

Elections in the 1970s

Elections in the 1980s

Elections in the 1990s

See also
 List of parliamentary constituencies in Wiltshire

Notes and references 

Parliamentary constituencies in Wiltshire (historic)
Constituencies of the Parliament of the United Kingdom established in 1918
Constituencies of the Parliament of the United Kingdom disestablished in 1997
Politics of the Borough of Swindon